Bobonaro, officially Bobonaro Administrative Post, is an administrative post (and was formerly a subdistrict) in Bobonaro municipality, East Timor. Its seat or administrative centre is Bobonaro, and its population at the 2010 census was 23,108.

References

External links 

  – information page on Ministry of State Administration site 

Administrative posts of East Timor
Bobonaro Municipality